The men's team sabre was one of seven fencing events on the fencing at the 1952 Summer Olympics programme. It was the ninth appearance of the event. The competition was held from 29 July 1952, to 30 July 1952. 85 fencers from 19 nations competed.

Competition format
The competition format continued the pool play round-robin from prior years. Each of the four fencers from one team would face each of the four from the other, for a total of 16 bouts per match. The team that won more bouts won the match, with competition potentially stopping when one team reached 9 points out of the possible 16 (this did not always occur and matches sometimes continued). If the bouts were 8–8, touches received was used to determine the winning team. Pool matches unnecessary to the result were not played.

Results

Round 1

The top two teams in each pool advanced to round 2.

Pool 1

France (11–5) and Poland (8–8, 63–63 touches against, unclear how match was determined) each beat Romania. Poland led 6–1 over France when that match was abandoned.

Pool 2

Austria (13–3) and Italy (9–1) each beat Venezuela.

Pool 3

Denmark (12–4) and Egypt (9–1) each beat Australia.

Pool 4

Germany (9–7) and Belgium (9–2) each beat the Soviet Union.

Pool 5

Hungary defeated Portugal 15–1, Argentina defeated Saar 12–4, Hungary defeated Saar 15–1, and Argentina defeated Portugal 9–5.

Pool 6

Great Britain (11–5) and the United States (9–2) each beat Switzerland.

Round 2

The top two teams in each pool advanced to the semifinals.

Pool 1

Great Britain (9–7) and Italy (9–1) each beat Argentina.

Pool 2

Austria (13–3) and Hungary (9–0) each beat Denmark.

Pool 3

The United States (11–5) and France (9–5) each beat Germany.

Pool 4

Poland (9–7) and Belgium (9–2) each beat Egypt.

Semifinals

The top two teams in each pool advanced to the final.

Semifinal 1

In the first pairing, Hungary defeated France 13–3 and Austria beat Belgium 9–7. In the second set of matches, Hungary defeated Belgium 13–3 and France defeated Austria 10–6. In the first of the two final matches, Hungary defeated Austria 12–4 to secure first place in the group and eliminate Austria (who would come third regardless of the result between France and Belgium). Belgium (0–2, 10–22 in bouts) and France (1–1, 13–19 in bouts) faced off for the second advancement spot; Belgium would need to win by at least 10–6 to overcome France's advantage in bouts (the tie-breaker if France, Austria, and Belgium all finished at 1–2). When France took a 7th bout in the match after a 6–6 start, the French were guaranteed second place in the group even if Belgium were to win the final three bouts (and thus the match); those final three bouts were not played and France was declared the match victor 7–6.

Semifinal 2

In the first pairing, Italy defeated Great Britain 11–5 and the United States beat Poland 10–6. In the second set of matches, the United States defeated Great Britain 9–5 and Italy defeated Poland 11–4. The two 2–0 teams advanced without playing each other; the two 0–2 teams likewise did not play each other.

Final

In the first pairings, Hungary defeated France 13–3 and Italy beat the United States 12–4. The second set of matches featured Hungary defeating the United States and Italy beating France, each by a score of 13–3. This made the France vs. United States match a de facto bronze medal match, won by France 8–6. (The match was stopped at 8 wins because the United States trailed in touches against 60–48 and even if the Americans won by the final two bouts 5–0 apiece to even the bouts at 8–8, the French would win on touches against 60–58). The Hungary vs. Italy match was for the gold medal. Italy took a 7–6 lead, but Hungary won the next two bouts to go ahead 8–7. The final bout (between each team's top fencers, Kovács and Darè) never took place; Hungary's 64–50 touch lead was so great that even had Darè been able to beat Kovács 5–0 to draw the teams even on bouts 8–8 the Hungarians would nevertheless win the match.

Rosters

Argentina
 Félix Galimi
 José D'Andrea
 Edgardo Pomini
 Daniel Sande
 Fulvio Galimi

Australia
 Charles Stanmore
 Jock Gibson
 John Fethers
 Ivan Lund

Austria
 Werner Plattner
 Heinz Putzl
 Hubert Loisel
 Heinz Lechner
 Paul Kerb

Belgium
 Marcel Van Der Auwera
 Gustave Ballister
 François Heywaert
 Robert Bayot
 Georges de Bourguignon
 Édouard Yves

Denmark
 Paul Theisen
 Raimondo Carnera
 Ivan Ruben
 Palle Frey
 Jakob Lyng

Egypt
 Mohamed Zulficar
 Mohamed Abdel Rahman
 Salah Dessouki
 Mahmoud Younes
 Ahmed Abou-Shadi

France
 Jacques Lefèvre
 Jean Laroyenne
 Maurice Piot
 Jean Levavasseur
 Bernard Morel
 Jean-François Tournon

Germany
 Siegfried Rossner
 Willy Fascher
 Hans Esser
 Richard Liebscher

Great Britain
 Roger Tredgold
 Olgierd Porebski
 Bob Anderson
 William Beatley
 Luke Wendon

Hungary
 Aladár Gerevich
 Tibor Berczelly
 Rudolf Kárpáti
 Pál Kovács
 László Rajcsányi
 Bertalan Papp

Italy
 Vincenzo Pinton
 Renzo Nostini
 Gastone Darè
 Mauro Racca
 Roberto Ferrari
 Giorgio Pellini

Poland
 Jerzy Twardokens
 Leszek Suski
 Jerzy Pawłowski
 Wojciech Zabłocki
 Zygmunt Pawlas

Portugal
 Álvaro Silva
 José Ferreira
 Augusto Barreto
 Jorge Franco
 João Pessanha

Romania
 Andrei Vîlcea
 Ion Santo
 Ilie Tudor
 Mihai Kokossy

Saar
 Karl Bach
 Willi Rössler
 Ernst Rau
 Günther Knödler
 Walter Brödel

Soviet Union
 Ivan Manayenko
 Mark Midler
 Vladimir Vyshpolsky
 Lev Kuznetsov
 Boris Belyakov

Switzerland
 Umberto Menegalli
 Oswald Zappelli
 Otto Greter
 Jules Amez-Droz

United States
 Norman Cohn-Armitage
 Joe de Capriles
 Tibor Nyilas
 Alex Treves
 George Worth
 Allan Kwartler

Venezuela
 Augusto Gutiérrez
 Olaf Sandner
 Gustavo Gutiérrez
 Edmundo López

References

Fencing at the 1952 Summer Olympics
Men's events at the 1952 Summer Olympics